B. floribunda may refer to:

 Bacopa floribunda, an aquatic plant
 Baeckea floribunda, a plant with oppositely arranged leaves
 Baissea floribunda, a tropical plant
 Berberis floribunda, a deciduous shrub
 Billardiera floribunda, a plant endemic to Australia
 Brachystegia floribunda, a tree native to tropical Africa
 Buddleja floribunda, a plant native to the Americas